= Progona VBK =

Volleyball club in Gothenburg, Sweden

- Full name: Progona volleybollklubb
- Short name: PVBK
- Ground: Gothenburg, Sweden

Progona VBK is a volleyball club in Gothenburg, Sweden. The club won the Swedish men's national championship in 1983.
